James Arthur Wellington Foley Butler, 4th Marquess of Ormonde (23 September 1849 – 4 July 1943) was the son of John Butler, 2nd Marquess of Ormonde and Frances Jane Paget. At the time of his birth, he was the third son of Lord and Lady Ormonde, and was christened James Arthur Wellington Foley Butler.

Career

Lord Arthur was educated at Harrow and at Trinity College, Cambridge. He later joined the army as a Lieutenant in the 1st Life Guards, and served as a State Stewart to Henry Herbert, 4th Earl of Carnarvon whilst the latter was Lord Lieutenant of Ireland.

He was a Justice of the Peace in the county of Kent and a Deputy Lieutenant in the County Kilkenny. He was the 28th Hereditary Chief Butler of Ireland. Unlike previous generations, he did not live in the family seat of Kilkenny Castle as his son inherited it directly from his uncle. The contents of the castle were sold in 1935 and the castle was left neglected.

Marriage and later life
He married the American heiress Ellen Stager (daughter of Gen. Anson Stager, of Chicago, Illinois, co-founder of Western Union) on 8 March 1887 and had four children:

After they were married the couple were known as Lord and Lady Arthur Butler. Lady Arthur brought a personal fortune upon her marriage of US$1,000,000, which was the equivalent of approximately £200,000 in 1887. Her father, General Anson Stager was an early pioneer of the use of the telegraph, and was the chief of U.S. Military Telegraph during the Civil War.

In 1891, the couple were recorded as living at 21 Park Lane, City of Westminster, London, and at Sandleford Priory, near Newbury, from at least 1895 to September 1898. They took a temporary residence in Cadogan Sqaure in 1898. Their London residence was recorded as being 7 Portman Square from early 1900 until at least 1924, and from at least late 1925 they leased 11 Bryanston Square in London. (11 Bryanston Square was recorded as being the home of another family until early-mid 1925) 11 Bryanston Square remained as their London home until at least 1938.

In 1909, Lord and Lady Arthur purchased Gennings House in Kent. This remained the home of Ellen, Lady Arthur Butler (later Marchioness of Ormonde) until her death in 1951. In 1921, the UK Census recorded their household as including a Butler, Footman, Cook, Lady's Maid, three Housemaids, two Kitchen Maids, a Scullery Maid, and Pantry Boy. 

After Lord Arthur's older brother, the 3rd Marquess of Ormonde, died in 1919 and Arthur inherited the title, Lord Ormonde's son George Butler, 5th Marquess of Ormonde inherited the bulk of the family estates in order to avoid double taxation. Pursuant to the will of the 3rd Marquess, Lord Ormonde was the beneficiary of an annual charge of £3,000 on the Ormonde Estate. Lord Arthur seems to have requested that his older brother alter his will in favor of his son George; records survive of a letter written by Lord Ormonde to George Butler dated 27 June 1916 outlining changes to his will which "your father has asked me to alter" which postponed Lord Arthur's use of the Ormonde Estate in favour of George, George's sons (at the time George's wife Sybil was pregnant with their only son, Anthony Butler) and George's brother Arthur and his male issue. Lord Ormonde requested that:

(1) George not make any alteration of the family seat, Kilkenny Castle, and shooting lodge, Ballyknockane Lodge, without consulting Lord Arthur and obtaining his approval;

(2) That Lord Arthur would have use of Plate and other articles "as he shall desire"; and, 

(3) That Lady Arthur, during the lifetime of Lord Arthur, would have use of any Family Jewels which Lord Ormonde had the power to dispose of.

In the 1920s the sister of Ellen, Marchioness of Ormonde, Mrs Annie Stager Hickox (of Cleveland, Ohio) died in Monte Carlo. She left a total estate of $847,207, half of which was left to Lady Ormonde.

His ashes lie in Ulcombe, Kent. His son inherited the title from him.

Issue

Lord and Lady Ormonde had four children:

Lady Evelyn Frances Butler (20 December 1887 - 15 April 1978), married with Vice-Adm. Hon. Edmund Rupert Drummond, CB MVO RN (ret.), son of 10th Viscount Strathallan and brother of 15th Earl of Perth and has issue.
 Anne Drummond (b. 30 June 1911)
 Jean Constance Drummond (b. 20 August 1914) 
 James Ralph Drummond (b. 28 March 1918)
James George Anson Butler, 5th Marquess of Ormonde (1890–1949)
 James Anthony Butler, Viscount Thurles (b. 18 August 1916)
 Lady Moyra Rosamund Butler (b. 2 December 1920)
James Arthur Norman Butler, 6th Marquess of Ormonde (1893–1971)
 Lady Jane Butler (b. 9 January 1925)
 Lady Martha Butler (b. 14 January 1926)
Lady Eleanor Rachel Butler (b. 24 April 1894), married firstly Captain Edward Brassey Egerton and secondly William Henry Prior (known latterly as Lady Rachel Prior).

See also
Butler dynasty

References

External links
 

1849 births
1943 deaths
People educated at Harrow School
Alumni of Trinity College, Cambridge
Arthur
Deputy Lieutenants of Kilkenny
English justices of the peace
Arthur 4